|}

The Platinum Stakes is a Listed flat horse race in Ireland open to thoroughbreds aged three years or older. It is run at Cork over a distance of 1 mile (1,609 metres), and it is scheduled to take place each year in August.

Records
Most successful horse:
 no horse has won this race more than once

Leading jockey (3 wins):
 Michael Kinane – Shakespeare (2000), Caradak (2004), Danak (2006)
Niall McCullagh – Tout A Coup (1997), Alanza (2011), Akeed Mofeed (2012)
Pat Smullen – Caumshinaun (2001), Eshera (2015), Rose De Pierre (2016)

Leading trainer (6 wins):
John Oxx – Miss Honorine (2002), Dossier (2003), Caradak (2004), Danak (2006), Alanza (2011), Akeed Mofeed (2012)

Winners

 The 2000 winner Shakespeare was later exported to Hong Kong and renamed Good Heavens.

See also
 Horse racing in Ireland
 List of Irish flat horse races

References
Racing Post:

Flat races in Ireland
Open mile category horse races
Cork Racecourse